The House of Egmond or Egmont (French: Maison d'Egmond, Dutch: Huis Egmond) is named after the Dutch town of Egmond, province of North Holland, and played an important role in the Netherlands during the Middle Ages and the Early modern period. The main lines Egmond-Geldern (Dukes of Geldern and Counts of Zutphen, extinct in 1538), Egmond-Gavere (Counts of Egmont, Princes of Gavere and Steenhuyze, extinct in 1682/1714) and Egmond-Buren-Leerdam (Counts of Buren and Leerdam, extinct in 1558) had high noble, princely rank.

Besides the main and secondary lines that have died out, there were also some illegitimate lines of the family, including the Egmond van Merenstein (extinct in 1559), Egmond van Kenenburg (extinct in 1703), Egmond van de Nijenburg (Imperial Barons; extinct in 1747) and Egmond van Cranenburch. Today there are still the extramarital lines of the Imperial Counts of Geldern-Egmond (today Mirbach-Geldern-Egmond) and the Barons of IJsselstein (also IJsselstein or Ysselstein).

History
They were one of the principal noble families of the County of Holland during the Middle Ages. The family said to be descendants of the Kings of Friesland and early Counts of future Holland, maintained some power due to its hereditary position as Voogd (Advocate) of the powerful Egmond Abbey in North Holland. They built their residence in Egmond aan den Hoef and became the Lords of Egmond. Thanks to a number of judicious marriages they were able to add the strategically important Lordship of IJsselstein and the semi-sovereign territory of the Lords of Arkel to their domains.

The family achieved even greater prominence in the period of Burgundian and Habsburg rule over the Netherlands.  In the late 15th century, the senior branch became the sovereign Dukes of Guelders, whilst the younger branch split into the Counts of Egmond (elevated to become Princes of Gavere in 1553) and the Counts of Buren and Leerdam. The senior branches of the family moved out in the 16th and 17th centuries, but illegitimate branches (such as that of the Bavarian Counts of Geldern-Egmond) flourished well into the 20th century.

The execution of Lamoral, Count of Egmont in 1568 helped spark the Dutch Revolt that eventually led to the independence of the Netherlands, while Anna van Egmond-Buren, known as Anna van Buren in the Netherlands, was the first wife of William the Silent, the leader of this national uprising. Ironically, in 1573 both Egmond Abbey and Egmond Castle were destroyed on order of William the Silent.

Though the family name may not be carried, direct descendents of the family are in existence, thus, not extinct.

Notable members of the family

For the earlier lords, see List of Lords and Counts of Egmont.
 John I, Lord of Egmond (before 1310–1369), Lord of Egmond and IJsselstein, stadtholder of Holland.
 Arnold I, Lord of Egmond (c. 1340–1409), Lord of Egmont and IJsselstein.
 John II, Lord of Egmond (c. 1385–1451), Regent of Guelders, Lord of Egmont.
 Arnold of Egmond (1410–1473), Duke of Guelders and Count of Zutphen.
 Mary of Guelders (1434–1463), Queen consort of Scotland, spouse of James II.
 Adolf, Duke of Guelders (1438–1477), Duke of Guelders and Count of Zutphen.
 Philippa of Guelders (1467–1547)
 Charles, Duke of Guelders (1467–1538), Duke of Guelders and Count of Zutphen.
 Catherine of Guelders (1439–1496), Regentess of Guelders.
 William IV of Egmont (1412–1483), Lord of Egmont and IJsselstein, stadtholder of Guelders.
 John III of Egmont (1438–1516), 1st Count of Egmont, 8th Lord of Purmerend, Purmerland and Ilpendam, stadtholder of Holland, Zeeland and West-Friesland.
 John IV of Egmont (1499–1528), 2nd Count of Egmont, 9th Lord of Purmerend, Purmerland and Ilpendam
 Charles I of Egmont (d. 1541), 3rd Count of Egmont, 10th Lord of Purmerend, Purmerland and Ilpendam
 Lamoral, Count of Egmont (1522–1568), 4th Count of Egmont, Prince of Gavere and Steenhuyze, 11th Lord of Purmerend, Purmerland and Ilpendam, stadtholder of Flanders and Artois etc.
 Philip, Count of Egmont (1558–1590), 5th Count of Egmont, Prince of Gavere and Steenhuyze, 12th and last Lord of Purmerend, Purmerland and Ilpendam.
 Lamoral II of Egmont (d. 1617), 6th Count of Egmont, Prince of Gavere and Steenhuyze
 Charles II of Egmont (1567–1620), 7th Count of Egmont, Prince of Gavere and Steenhuyze, married to Marie de Lens, Lady of Aubigny.
 Alberta of Egmont, married to René de Renesse, 1st Count of Warfusée
 Louis of Egmont (1600–1654), 8th Count of Egmont, Prince of Gavere and Steenhuyze
 Louis Philip of Egmont (1630–1682), 9th Count of Egmont, Prince of Gavere and Steenhuyze
 Marie Claire of Egmont (1661-1714), 12th Countess of Egmont, Princess of Gavere m. Niccolo Pignatelli, Duke of Bisaccia
 Egmont Pignatelli family, extinct in 1809.
 Louis Ernest of Egmont (1665-1693), 10th Count of Egmont, Prince of Gavere
 Procope François of Egmont (1669-1707), 11th Count of Egmont, Prince of Gavere
 George van Egmond (1504–1559), Bishop of Utrecht
 Frederik van Egmond (c. 1440–1521), Count of Buren and Leerdam, Lord of IJsselstein etc.
 Floris van Egmont (1470–1539), Count of Buren and Leerdam, stadtholder of Guelders and Friesland.
 Maximiliaan van Egmond (1509–1548), Count of Buren, Leerdam and Lingen, stadtholder of Friesland.
 Anna van Egmont (1533–1558), Countess of Lingen, Buren and Leerdam, Lady of IJsselstein etc.
 Anna van Egmont the Elder (1504-1574), Countess of Horne
 (illeg.) Christoffel van IJsselstein
 William of Egmond jr. (died 1494), stadtholder of Guelders.

Coat of arms
Shield: Or, seven chevronels gules. The Egmond coat of arms is depicted in the medieval Gelre Armorial (folio 83v)

Note

The Irish Perceval family, which erroneously claims descent from the house of Egmond, was admitted to the Irish peerage as Earls of Egmont in 1722.

See also

 List of Lords and Counts of Egmont
 Barony of IJsselstein
 Duchy of Guelders
 Zutphen County
 County of Buren and Leerdam
 Lordship of Purmerend, Purmerland and Ilpendam
 Principality of Gavere
 Egmont pact
 Egmont Palace

Notes

References

External links
 

 
Dutch nobility
Noble families